Hoseynabad-e Ghinab (also Romanized as Ḩoseynābād-e Ghīnāb; also known as Ḩasanābād, Ḩoseynābād, Ḩoseynābād-e Ghīāb, and Husainābād) is a village in Momenabad Rural District, in the Central District of Sarbisheh County, South Khorasan Province, Iran. At the 2006 census, its population was 27, in 7 families.

References 

Populated places in Sarbisheh County